Morgan Township is one of fourteen townships in Rowan County, North Carolina, United States. The township had a population of 3,439 according to the 2000 census.

Geographically, Morgan Township occupies  in southeastern Rowan County and is the largest township by land area in Rowan County.  There are no incorporated municipalities in Morgan Township.  The township's eastern border is with the Yadkin River and the township contains a portion of High Rock Lake.

Townships in Rowan County, North Carolina
Townships in North Carolina